The Potez 58 was a family of French light utility and touring aircraft, developed in mid-1930s. They were three-seat single-engine high-wing monoplanes.

Design and development
The plane was a further development of Potez 43 family, tracing its roots from Potez 36. An airframe changed little from Potez 43, main difference were stronger engines. A prototype Potez 58 first flew on 7 March 1934. In September 1934 the first serial variant Potez 580 was flown, powered with 120 hp radial engine Potez 6B. There were built 80 of this variant. An air ambulance variant was also evaluated.

There were next built several small-series variants, differing with the last digit in designation. The second variant built in a significant series was Potez 585 – 108 built.

Mixed construction strutted high-wing monoplane. Rectangular two-spar wing, with rounded ends, supported with V-shaped spars. Wings were equipped with slats on 1/3 span. Closed cabin with three seats. Radial engine in front, with a Townend ring, two-blade propeller. Conventional fixed landing gear, with a rear skid, wheels in teardrop covers.

Operational history
French Air Force operated 99 Potez 585 as liaison aircraft.

Variants
Potez 58
Prototype.
Potez 580
First series variant of 1934,  Potez 6B engine; 80 built.
Potez 582
Potez 584
Variant with  de Havilland Gipsy Major I straight engine; 4 built in 1935.
Potez 585
Liaison and utility aircraft,  Potez 6Ba engine; 108 built.
Potez 586
Four-seater variant; 10 built in 1936–1937.

Operators

French Air Force

Spanish Republican Air Force

Specifications (Potez 585)

See also

References

Bibliography

External links

Photo at Ugolok Neba page
Potez 58 series  at Aviatsya (in Russian)
Potez at Aviafrance

1930s French civil utility aircraft
058
High-wing aircraft
Single-engined tractor aircraft
Aircraft first flown in 1934